The athletics competition at the Inter-Allied Games was held at the Stade Pershing from 22 June to 6 July 1919 in Paris, France. The event was open to all military personnel from countries that were among the Allies of World War I.

The athletics competition consisted of 24 men's events, 20 of which counted towards the team scores. The standard international judging rules were applied, with field event results measured in metres, and the winner of the track event being timed by three judges separately. The 10-kilometre cross country running competition (not a medal event here) covered natural landscapes around the Joinville-le-Pont with a start and finishing point within the stadium. The reduced-distance 16,000 m marathon was organised similarly, except the extra-stadium course were the local streets in the area.

The Americans, headed by team captain and Olympic medallist Richard Byrd and featuring a number of college-level athletes, clearly topped the points table with 92 compared to runner-up France with 12. Points were assigned on a by-event basis of one point for third, two points for second, and three points for first. The gathering marked a key development of the sport of track and field within France, as American personnel and YMCA sports coaches both coached and exhibited the various common American events at that time.

The foremost track athletes at the games were Charley Paddock, who won a 100 metres/200 metres sprint double, and Robert Simpson, who completed a similar feat in the hurdles. Frenchman Jean Vermeulen won a long-distance running double by taking the cross country and modified marathon titles, despite having a crippled arm from the war. The 200 metres hurdles event was won by Simpson in a time just one fifth of a second short of the world record at that time, even though the athletes had the disadvantage of one of the hurdles being misplaced by a margin of two metres. The American's winning time of 1:30.8 in the 4×200 metres relay was declared a new world record at the time, but was later discovered to be inferior to a time run at the Penn Relays one month earlier.

An unorthodox addition to the track and field events was the hand grenade throwing competition. This non-point-scoring event consisted of throwing for distance rather than accuracy and the winning distance of 245 feet and 11 inches, set by American military chaplain Fred Thomson, was declared a new world record. Two other non-point-scoring events were reserved for men who had served as part of an Army of Occupation during the war: a long jump contest and a 4×200 metres relay race. In that relay race the Italian team protested the victory, but a subsequent run-off resulted in the same outcome, with France first and Italy second. The hammer throw was absent from the programme, but two Americans—Pat Ryan and William McCormick—gave a demonstration of their speciality event.

Medal summary

Men

† The pentathlon consisted of the following five events: 200 metres, long jump, shot put, discus throw, and 1500 metres.

Team points standing

NB: Cross country, grenade throwing, and the Army of Occupation events did not count towards the team standings.

References

Medalists
Inter-Allied Games. GBR Athletics. Retrieved on 2015-01-30.

External links
Video footage of the Inter-Allied Games

Inter-Allied Games Athletics
Inter-Allied Games
Inter-Allied Games Athletics
Inter-Allied Games
Inter-Allied Games
Inter-Allied Games
Inter-Allied Games